KF Ada is an Albanian football club based in the city of Velipojë which is situated in Shkodër County. The club's home ground is the Reshit Rusi Stadium and they currently compete in the Kategoria e Dytë.

History
The club was founded on 6 March 1996 as a sports society by Lazër Matia, Alfred Pjetri, Filip Kercunga, Marash Qytetza and Prend Përndreca. The name Ada derives from the Adriatic island of Ada Bojana in nearby Montenegro. A previous club had existed in the city under the name KS Velipoja, which was run by the Municipality before funding was stopped and the team dissolved. KF Ada first competed in the Albanian Third Division, but they soon achieved promotion to the Albanian Second Division. In the 2004–05 season KF Ada reached the playoffs of the Second Division and beat KS Burreli 2–1 in the final to achieve promotion to the Albanian First Division.

Women's team
National women's football competitions in Albania were first played out in the 2009/10 season. One season later Ada won the Albanian Women's Cup and the Albanian women's football championship. The team then represented Albania in the 2011–12 UEFA Women's Champions League. It was the very first time a team from Albania had entered the competition since its creation in 2001–02. They played three seasons in the Champions League, losing all their nine group matches with 0–34, 2–46 and 1–23 goals.

The women's section disbanded after the 2012/13 season. The whole team and personal joined KF Vllaznia Shkodër where they established a new women's team. In its short history the teams has won the championship three times (2010, 2011, 2012) and won the cup once (2011).

Current squad

References

External links
Soccerway profile

Football clubs in Albania
1996 establishments in Albania
Sport in Shkodër
Association football clubs established in 1996
Kategoria e Dytë clubs
Albanian Third Division clubs